Carabus albrechti awashimae is a subspecies of ground beetle in the subfamily Carabinae that is endemic to Japan.

References

albrechti awashimae
Beetles described in 1996
Endemic fauna of Japan